Frank Howard Clark (1888 – January 19, 1962) was an American screenwriter. He wrote for 100 films between 1913 and 1946. He was born in Pittsburgh, Pennsylvania and died in Los Angeles, California.

Selected filmography

 Bull's Eye (1917)
 The Fighting Grin (1918)
 The Magic Eye (1918)
 Nobody's Wife (1918)
 The Midnight Man (1919)
 Yvonne from Paris (1919)
 Flame of Youth (1920)
 Prairie Trails (1920)
 The Mother Heart (1921)
 Hands Off! (1921)
 Dusk to Dawn (1922)
 Billy Jim (1922)
 Conquering the Woman (1922)
 Her Dangerous Path (1923)
 Desert Rider (1923)
 American Manners (1924)
 Stepping Lively (1924)
 Laughing at Danger (1924)
 Wolves of the North (1924)
 $50,000 Reward (1924)
 Blue Blood (1925)
 Jimmie's Millions (1925)
 Youth and Adventure (1925)
 Under Fire (1926)
 The Flying Mail (1926)
 The Night Patrol (1926)
 The Fighting Buckaroo (1926)
 The Prairie King (1927)
 Tom's Gang (1927)
 The Boy Rider (1927)
 The Desert Pirate (1927)
 Splitting the Breeze (1927)
 The Texas Tornado (1928)
 The Little Buckaroo (1928)
 The Bantam Cowboy (1928)
 Trail of Courage (1928)
 Dog Law (1928)
 Phantom of the Range (1928)
 Rough Ridin' Red (1928)
 Wizard of the Saddle (1928)
 Tracked (1928)
 The Fightin' Redhead (1928)
 The Avenging Rider (1928)
 Idaho Red (1929)
The Freckled Rascal  (1929)
 The Pride of Pawnee (1929)
 The Utah Kid (1930)
 The Lone Rider (1930)
 The Fighting Marshal (1931)
 The Fighting Fool (1932)

External links

1888 births
1962 deaths
American male screenwriters
20th-century American male writers
20th-century American screenwriters